IceWarp, Inc. is a software company located in Prague, Czech Republic. It develops IceWarp Mail Server, an email, messaging and collaboration service for small, medium and enterprise level businesses. IceWarp has offices in the United States, Germany, Russia, the Czech Republic and India. The company has been in business since 1998 and is used by over 50,000 businesses around the world. Its product is alternative to Exchange Server, Office 365 or G Suite.

Awards 
On June 17, 2011, IceWarp was selected as a Red Herring Top 100 North America Technology company and again in 2012. 

IceWarp also won an award for the Red Herring Top 100 Global.

IceWarp has also won awards from TMCnet for Unified Communications product of the year for 2011 and 2012.

In 2016, IceWarp has won a 2016 Real Time Web Solutions Excellence Award.

In 2018 and 2019, IceWarp has been awarded a CIO Choice for Enterprise email.

Products 
IceWarp Mail Server is a mail server integrating all communication & collaboration features in one unified application. Available in cloud or for on-premises deployment, IceWarp is a tool to share and exchange all information and ideas online, offline or via mobile devices. It runs on Windows as well as on Linux and current version is 11.4.5. The product was named Merak Mail Server in the past.

IceWarp is also sponsoring and developing LibreOffice Online, a web-browser-based office suite.

In 2017, IceWarp acquired Mirapoint Email Appliance.

Supported control panels
Hosting Controller
Parallels Plesk

See also 
Message transfer agent

References

Software companies based in Virginia
Privately held companies based in Virginia
LibreOffice
Software companies of the United States
1998 establishments in the United States
1998 establishments in Virginia
Software companies established in 1998
Companies established in 1998
Software companies of the Czech Republic